Matías Emilio Delgado (born 15 December 1982) is a retired  Argentine footballer who last played as an attacking midfielder for Swiss Super League Club FC Basel.

Club career

Early career
Delgado started his career in the youth team of River Plate. He also played over 50 top division games for Chacarita Juniors before deciding to test himself in Europe at the age of 20.

FC Basel
Delgado transferred to FC Basel Switzerland in August 2003 signed a four-year contract. He eventually spent three years at the club, scoring 41 goals in 114 top-flight matches. During his time with RotBlau Delgado wore number 20 shirt. He played his debut match for his new club in the St. Jakob-Park on 3 September 2003 as he was substituted in the 68th minute. Just two minutes later he played a decisive pass to Hervé Tum who then scored his team's third goal as Basel beat St. Gallen 4–1. He scored his first goal for Basel on 2 October in their away win in the Stade de la Maladière (1924) as Basel beat Neuchâtel Xamax 3–1. The Super League season started impeccably, Basel won the first thirteen matches straight off. They completed the first half of the season undefeated, with seventeen wins and one draw. Basel remained in top position right up until the end of the season, thus achieving tenth championship title. At the end of the season. Delgado had 20 league appearances scoring two goals.

Delgado achieved his second championship title in the 2004–05 Super League season. During Basel's 2004–05 season he scored 11 goals in his 34 appearances. He scored one goal in the 2004–05 UEFA Cup group stage, this being the equalizer in the 1–1 draw in the Arena AufSchalke. Delgado missed out on the championship title in the 2005–06 Super League season as Basel lost the last game of the season 1–2 at home against Zürich. But he achieved the top-scorer award in the 2005–06 UEFA Cup with 7 goals. With his 18 league goals, he was second highest scorer behind Alhassane Keita (20 goals).

Beşiktaş
On 28 June 2006 it was announced that Delgado transferred to Beşiktaş J.K. of Istanbul for $6.5m of dollars. He declared his target was taking the place of Riquelme in the Argentina squad. He also admires the skills of fellow Argentine playmaker Pablo Aimar. Delgado is a good playmaker, as well as a scorer. He is known for his quick and unexpected through passes and accurate long range shots. Other than that, he is an excellent user of free kicks. He has also scored a well amount of header goals to be remembered. He is a good aimer of the ball, often putting it near the pole, whether it's with his head or with his foot. He was the captain of Beşiktaş J.K. wearing number 10 jersey.

At the end of the season 2008/2009. Delgado sustained a hard groin injury. He underwent an operation in Barcelona and was expected to get well somewhere around the end of 2009 or the beginning of 2010, sometime around the month of December or January. At that time there was a great dilemma around Delgado's contract with the club. Delgado refused to have his contract suspended. Although, the club needed a number 10 player. Delgado was blocking a transfer option for Beşiktaş J.K. After a lot of thinking and discussing, including bringing in Delgado's father and manager Eduardo Delgado, they finally came to a conclusion. They had his contract frozen until January 2010. The fans say about the star player: We believe that it is not fair for the club to do this after the great performance he has been giving. He got injured playing for the team, not playing football on the beach. But we believe that he will reclaim his club shirt after he gets well. The club can buy a lot of new players but taking his number will be a hard thing to accomplish. By June 2010, Delgado started to train with Beşiktaş J.K. again.

At the beginning of 2010/2011. season Delgado was in first eleven again captaining the team on four occasions and scoring four times in the process. But Beşiktaş J.K. was not satisfied with him and bringing in Guti to the club forced Delgado to leave.

Al Jazira
Delgado signed for Abu Dhabi-based club Al Jazira on 23 August 2010 for a fee estimated around 2.250.000 €. He was given number 22 shirt. Since his arriving to the club he was almost ever present first eleven player. As usually, he played a playmaker role pulling strings in the midfield. In his first season at Mohammed bin Zayed Stadium he won UAE Pro-League and UAE Predsident's Cup scoring 8 times in 27 matches. Delgado continued with his great plays in the following 2011–12 season scoring 7 times on 28 occasions and club awarded him with a new 2 years contract extension. In that season club added another UAE President's Cup to its silverware and reached Round of 16 of AFC Champions League, but could not manage to retain UAE Pro-League title. In the season 2012/2013. Delgado once again displayed his fenomenal individual performances scoring 6 times in 32 matches while making plentiful of assists (and finishing some matches with a three or four assists). However, that did not satisfied Al Jazira which decided to terminate his contract at 10 June 2013.

Return to FC Basel
On 13 July 2013 Basel announced that they had successfully arranged the return of Delgado to the club. He played his first match after his return on 11 August 2013, as he was used as a sub in the 61st minute, against Zürich. 
At the end of the 2013–14 Super League season Delgado won his third league championship with Basel. Delgado scoring 2 goals and making 6 assists in 25 appearances. Basel also reached the final of the 2013–14 Swiss Cup, but were beaten 2–0 by Zürich after extra time. In Swiss Cup he scored once converting a penalty kick. In the 2013–14 Champions League season Basel in the group stage finished the group in third position to qualify for Europa League knockout phase and here they advanced as far as the quarter-finals. Delgado played all 6 games in the Champions League Group Stage contributing to the team with one assist. He scored two goals in first Basel's match of UEFA Europa League's Quarter-finals versus Valencia of which the first was a beautiful 20-meters placed shot. He finished the 2013/2014 season with 5 goals and 9 assists to his name in 40 matches for the club.

The season 2014–15 was a very successful one for Delgado and for Basel. The Club won the championship for the sixth time in a row that season (twice in a row for Delgado) and in the 2014–15 Swiss Cup they reached the final. But for the third season in a row, they finished as runners-up, losing 0–3 to FC Sion in the final. Basel entered the Champions League in the group stage and reached the knockout phase as on 9 December 2014 they managed a 1–1 draw at Anfield against Liverpool. But then Basel lost to Porto in the Round of 16. Basel played a total of 65 matches (36 Swiss League fixtures, 6 Swiss Cup, 8 Champions League and 15 test matches). Under trainer Paulo Sousa Delgado totaled 46 appearances, 26 League, 6 Cup, 2 Champions League, as well 12 in test games. He scored 16 goals in these matches, of which 8 in the Swiss Super League, 2 in the Cup and 6 in test games.

On 10 July 2015 Basel announced that Delgado was named as new captain for the 2015-16 season after Marco Streller retired. On 19 August 2015, Delgado scored a penalty in a 2–2 draw against Israeli side Maccabi Tel Aviv in the St. Jakob-Park in the first leg of the Champions League playoffs. Under trainer Urs Fischer Delgado won the Swiss Super League championship at the end of the 2015–16 Super League season for the fifth time On 10 December 2016 Delgado played his 250th game for Basel. and at the end of the 2016–17 Super League season for the sixth time, his Fourth in seiries. For the club this was the eighth title in a row and their 20th championship title in total. They also won the Swiss Cup for the twelfth time, which meant they had won the double for the sixth time in the club's history.

Career statistics

Club

Honours

Club
Basel
 Swiss Super League: 2003–04, 2004–05, 2013–14, 2014–15, 2015–16, 2016–17
 Swiss Cup: 2016–17
Beşiktaş JK
 Turkish Super League: 2008-09
 Turkish Cup: 2006-07, 2008-09
 Turkish Super Cup: 2006
Al-Jazira Club
 UAE Pro-League: 2010-11
 UAE President's Cup: 2010-11, 2011-12

Individual
Basel
 Swiss Footballer of the Year: 2005–06
 UEFA Cup Top Goalscorer: 2005–06

Sources and references
 All scorers 2005–06 UEFA Cup according to (excluding preliminary round) according to protocols UEFA + all scorers preliminary round

External links

Profile on the Swiss Football League homepage
Statistics at Guardian Stats Centre

1982 births
Living people
Footballers from Rosario, Santa Fe
Association football midfielders
Argentine footballers
Argentine expatriate footballers
Argentine Primera División players
Chacarita Juniors footballers
FC Basel players
Expatriate footballers in Switzerland
Swiss Super League players
Beşiktaş J.K. footballers
Expatriate footballers in Turkey
Süper Lig players
Argentine expatriate sportspeople in Turkey
Al Jazira Club players
UAE Pro League players